Haitian Cubans are Cuban citizens of full or partial Haitian ancestry.

Origins
Haitian culture and French and Haitian Creole languages, first entered Cuba with the arrival of Haitian immigrants at the start of the 19th century. Haiti was a French colony, and the final years of the 1791-1804 Haitian Revolution brought a wave of French settlers fleeing with their Haitian slaves to Cuba. They came mainly to the east, and especially Guantanamo, where the French later introduced sugar cultivation, constructed sugar refineries and developed coffee plantations. 

By 1804, some 30,000 French were living in Baracoa and Maisí, the furthest eastern municipalities of the province.

Haitian immigrant workers (1912-1939)
Due to the United States occupation of Haiti, many Haitians left to find work as laborers in neighboring countries like Cuba. These immigrants lived a fine line trying to maintain their Haitian culture and assimilating enough to be able to work and live in a foreign society.  In 1937, over 25,000 Haitians were forcibly removed from Cuba and sent back to Haiti. This different treatment of migrant laborers is due to several factors. Cuban racists beliefs combined with economic concerns were a direct catalyst for this drastic Haitian exodus.

Revolution
Cubans feared a repeat of the Haitian Revolution, which was not quelled by the current guerrilla warfare in Haiti by the caco forces against the Americans. Similarly, black Haitians were stereotyped as being violent and rife with crime. Being the subject of stereotypes wasn't uncommon in Cuba, as black Cubans were often stereotyped the same way.

Religion
Haitian practice of vodou, was often mistaken for  "witchcraft."

Language
The vast majority of Haitians spoke Haitian Creole, which created a language barrier forcing Haitians to remain in agricultural labor.

Housing practices
Haitians lived in small communities near the sugar cane plantations, very rural and removed from populous cities.

Education
Economic restraints amongst Haitians kept education informal and contained in their small communities, as such, very few of these Haitians had anything above a basic level of Creole literacy. This enabled Haitians to keep control over the cultural values their children received.

Haitian religion
Majority of Haitians are Catholic but vodou is also present behind the scenes. Vodou is decentralized and flexible. The rituals involved in vodou strengthen community ties and help the oppressed Haitians deal with their suffering.

Recent years
Haitians have continued to come to Cuba to work as braceros (hand workers, from the Spanish word brazo, meaning "arm") in the fields cutting cane. Their living and working conditions were not much better than slavery. Although they planned to return to Haiti, most stayed on in Cuba. For years, many Haitians and their descendants in Cuba did not identify themselves as such or speak Creole. In the eastern part of the island, many Haitians continued to suffer discrimination. But according to the Fidel Castro regime, since 1959, when he took over, this discrimination has stopped.

Notable Haitian Cubans

 Benito Martínez, claimed to be the world's oldest living person

References

External links
 "Creole Language and Culture: Part of Cuba's Cultural Patrimony", by Susan Hurlich, 21 May 1998
 "Haitian Heritage In Cuba ... As Heard Through Song", National Public Radio, February 20, 2012

Further reading
 Sklodowska, Elzbieta. Espectros y espejismos: Haití en el imaginario cubano. Iberoamericana Editorial (2009). .

Cuba–Haiti relations
Ethnic groups in Cuba
Cuban